Ardent Records is an American record label based in Memphis, which was founded by John Fry in 1959. Ardent of the 1960s and 1970s featured pop music acts and was distributed by Stax Records from 1972 until 1975. It is best remembered today for Big Star, whose first two albums, released in 1972 and 1974, helped define the style known as power pop. The label was initially an attempt by the R&B-focused Stax to move into rock music, but distribution problems prevented any releases from succeeding. Big Star became widely known through 1980s reissues and the long delayed first release of Third/Sister Lovers, recorded in 1974.

The label was revived in the 1990s with two divisions: Alternative Mainstream and Contemporary Christian. Former Big Star guitarist Alex Chilton released recordings on the Ardent mainstream division, which also released recordings by bands such as Spot, Jolene, Two Minutes Hate, The Idlewilds, Neighborhood Texture Jam, and Techno-Squid Eats Parliament. The mainstream division of Ardent Records was closed in the mid-1990s.

Ardent's Christian label issued its first Christian releases in 1995. Initial projects included albums from Big Tent Revival, Skillet, and Smalltown Poets. To date, Ardent Records has released more than 35 albums by artists such as Todd Agnew, Jonah33, Smalltown Poets, Satellite Soul, Clear, All Together Separate, Brother's Keeper, Justifide, Before You Breathe, NonFiction, and Joy Whitlock. In 2005, Ardent signed a deal with INO Records, a division of Integrity Media, to distribute and market its entire roster. The label's albums are recorded at Ardent Studios in Memphis.

Roster
The following artists have performed under the Ardent label.

Former – mainstream and rock and roll

Christian

Former – Christian

Current – mainstream
Greyhounds

References

External links
 Official site

American record labels
Record labels established in 1959
Re-established companies
Pop record labels
Rock record labels
Christian record labels
Stax Records